Anatoly Konstantinovich Konev (January 10, 1921 – November 9, 1965) was a Russian basketball player. He trained at the Armed Forces sports society, in Moscow.

Club career
Konev played club basketball with CSKA Moscow.

Russian national team
Konev played with the senior Soviet Union national basketball team at the 1952 Summer Olympics, where he won a silver medal. He played in all eight of the Soviet Union's games.

References

External links
profile

1921 births
1965 deaths
Russian men's basketball players
Soviet men's basketball players
Olympic basketball players of the Soviet Union
PBC CSKA Moscow players
Basketball players at the 1952 Summer Olympics
Olympic silver medalists for the Soviet Union
Armed Forces sports society athletes
FIBA EuroBasket-winning players
Olympic medalists in basketball
Medalists at the 1952 Summer Olympics
Honoured Masters of Sport of the USSR